Mangal Bari is a suburb of Old Malda in Malda district of West Bengal, India. It is governed by the Old Malda Municipality.

Geography
Mangal Bari is situated at he eastern bank of river Mahananda in Malda.

References

Cities and towns in Malda district